Government Medical College, Gondia is a full-fledged tertiary Government medical college in Gondia, Maharashtra. The college imparts the degree Bachelor of Medicine and Bachelor of Surgery (MBBS). It is recognised by the Medical Council of India. The hospital associated with the college is one of the largest in Gondia district.

Selection to the college is done on the basis of merit through the National Eligibility and Entrance Test. Yearly undergraduate student intake is 150.

References

External links 
http://www.gmcgondia.in/

Medical colleges in Maharashtra
Universities and colleges in Maharashtra
Educational institutions established in 2016
2016 establishments in Maharashtra
Affiliates of Maharashtra University of Health Sciences